Dallas is an American prime time television soap opera developed by Cynthia Cidre and produced by Warner Horizon Television, that aired on TNT from June 13, 2012, to September 22, 2014. The series was a revival of the prime time television soap opera of the same name that was created by David Jacobs and which aired on CBS from 1978 to 1991. The series revolves around the Ewings, an affluent Dallas family in the oil and cattle-ranching industries.

The series brought back several stars of the original series, including Patrick Duffy as Bobby Ewing, Linda Gray as Sue Ellen Ewing, and Larry Hagman as J.R. Ewing in major roles. Other stars of the original series made guest appearances, including Ken Kercheval as Cliff Barnes, Steve Kanaly as Ray Krebbs, and Charlene Tilton as Lucy Ewing, as well as Ted Shackelford as Gary Ewing, and Joan van Ark as Valene Ewing, who starred in the Dallas spin-off series Knots Landing. They were joined by the next generation of characters, including Josh Henderson as John Ross Ewing III, the son of J.R. and Sue Ellen Ewing; Jesse Metcalfe as Christopher Ewing, the adopted son of Bobby and Pamela Barnes Ewing; and Julie Gonzalo as Pamela Rebecca Barnes, the daughter of Cliff Barnes and Afton Cooper.

The series was made for TNT, sister company to Warner Bros. Television, which has owned the original series since its purchase of Lorimar Television (the original show's production company) in 1989. On July 8, 2011, after viewing the completed pilot episode, TNT gave a green light for the series with a 10-episode order, which premiered on June 13, 2012. On June 29, 2012, TNT renewed Dallas for a second season consisting of 15 episodes, which premiered on January 28, 2013. On April 30, 2013, TNT renewed Dallas for a third season consisting of 15 episodes that premiered on Monday, February 24, 2014. On October 3, 2014, the series was cancelled by TNT after three seasons, because of the declining ratings.

Plot
The series revolves around the Ewings, an affluent Dallas family in the oil and cattle-ranching industries. It focuses mainly on Christopher Ewing (Jesse Metcalfe), the adopted son of Bobby (Patrick Duffy) and Pamela Barnes Ewing (Victoria Principal), and John Ross Ewing III (Josh Henderson), the son of J.R. (Larry Hagman) and Sue Ellen Ewing (Linda Gray). Both John Ross and Christopher were born during the original series' run and were featured in it as children (although played by different actors). Now grown up, John Ross has become almost a carbon copy of his father, bent on oil, money, and power. Christopher, meanwhile, has become a lot like Bobby, in that he is more interested in the upkeep of Southfork Ranch. As an additional point of contention, Christopher is also becoming a player in alternative energy (methane clathrate recovery), thereby eschewing the oil business. However, John Ross is determined to resurrect the Ewings' former position in the oil industry. John Ross states in season 1 that he is J.R.'s eldest child, which contradicts the storyline in the original series where J.R.'s first born son James Beaumont appeared in seasons 13–14.

Alongside John Ross and Christopher, original series characters Bobby, J.R. and Sue Ellen return as full cast members for the new series. Additional familiar characters, including J.R.'s and Bobby's niece Lucy Ewing (Charlene Tilton), their half-brother Ray Krebbs (Steve Kanaly), and Ewing family rival Cliff Barnes (Ken Kercheval) appear occasionally as guest stars. Various other actors/characters from the original series also make appearances, including Audrey Landers (Afton Cooper), Cathy Podewell (Cally Harper Ewing) and Deborah Shelton (Mandy Winger). Ted Shackelford and Joan Van Ark, who first appeared on Dallas in the late 1970s before joining the spin-off series Knots Landing, also return as Gary and Valene Ewing.

New main characters that made their appearances in season 1 included Bobby's third wife, Ann (Brenda Strong); Christopher's new wife, introduced as "Rebecca Sutter" but later revealed to be Pamela Rebecca Barnes (Julie Gonzalo), the daughter of Cliff Barnes and Afton Cooper; and Elena Ramos (Jordana Brewster), the daughter of Ewing family cook Carmen Ramos (Marlene Forte), who is caught in a love triangle with Christopher and John Ross. Harris Ryland (Mitch Pileggi) plays Ann's villainous ex-husband. New main characters that made their appearances in season 2 included Ann and Harris's daughter, Emma Ryland (Emma Bell), and Elena Ramos's brother Drew Ramos (Kuno Becker). In season 2, Judith Brown Ryland (Judith Light) joined the cast as Harris Ryland's controlling mother, while in season 3, Nicolas Treviño (Juan Pablo Di Pace) joined as a childhood friend of Elena and Drew's who returns to help Cliff Barnes take over the Ewing oil company.

Cast and characters

Regular cast
 Josh Henderson as John Ross Ewing III, the son of J.R. and Sue Ellen. Ambitious and anxious to prove himself by following in his father's footsteps, he is determined to start drilling for oil at Southfork. In the episode "Love & Family" he marries Pamela Rebecca Barnes.
 Jesse Metcalfe as Christopher Ewing, the adopted son of Bobby and his ex-wife Pamela Barnes Ewing and the biological son of Sue Ellen's younger sister Kristin Shepard. In the pilot, after spending years in Asia researching alternative energy, Christopher returns to Southfork to get married. In the season 3 finale, he was apparently killed by a car bomb.
 Jordana Brewster as Elena Ramos, the daughter of the Ewing family cook, and childhood friend of Christopher and John Ross, both of whom are in love with her. She has a master's degree in energy resources. In the season 3 finale, it was revealed that she is pregnant. She was escaping Nicolas with Christopher and was in a filling station bathroom checking a pregnancy test kit when she heard the car exploding, and ran out screaming Christopher's name. 
 Julie Gonzalo as Pamela Rebecca Barnes, under the alias of Rebecca Sutter she marries Christopher in the pilot and was pregnant with twins but miscarried them in "Guilt & Innocence". It is revealed in the season 1 finale that she is Cliff Barnes's daughter with Afton Cooper. In the episode "Love & Family", her marriage to Christopher is finally annulled, and she and John Ross get married at the end of the episode. When she catches John Ross in an illicit affair with Emma Ryland, she purposely overdoses on sleeping pills. When she recovers, she informs him that while their marriage is over, she will not divorce him because they had no prenuptial agreement and she will not allow him to take half her shares in the company. Pamela, knowing that her father Cliff Barnes had ordered the explosion of the rig when he knew she was on board and caused her to lose her babies, got her revenge by visiting him in a Mexican prison and giving him the title to Ewing land he coveted but not the pardon he had been given to release him from prison.
 Brenda Strong as Ann Ewing, Bobby's third wife and an old friend of Sue Ellen. She has assumed the role of matriarch of Southfork while dealing with her ruthless brother-in-law J.R. Ewing and her ex-husband Harris Ryland. Most of season 3 involved her complicated relationship with her daughter, former mother-in-law Judith, and her mixed feelings for her ex-husband Harris. 
 Patrick Duffy as Bobby Ewing, the youngest son of Jock and Miss Ellie and the adoptive father of Christopher. A family man at heart and owner of the Southfork Ranch, Bobby is determined to keep the promise he made to his now-deceased mother: never to allow oil drilling on Southfork.
 Linda Gray as Sue Ellen Ewing, the mother of John Ross and J.R.'s ex-wife. Since leaving J.R., Sue Ellen has grown confident and influential with a budding career in politics and ran for governor. She still harbors feelings of guilt for using John Ross in revenge against J.R. during his childhood.
 Larry Hagman as J.R. Ewing, (seasons 1–2) The eldest son of Jock and Miss Ellie and John Ross's father. A cunning and ruthless oil baron, J.R. has spent his recent years in a nursing home, being treated for clinical depression. Hagman died during production of season 2, signalling the on-screen death of J.R. Ewing. J.R. returned in 2014 in season 3 using unused footage of the character.
 Emma Bell as Emma Brown (seasons 2–3) daughter of Ann Ewing and Harris Ryland.  Her birth name is revealed in season 2 as Emma Judith Ryland. She starts romances with John Ross and Drew Ramos.
 Mitch Pileggi as Harris Ryland (seasons 2–3, recurring previously), the head of Ryland Transport and Ann's ex-husband. Ruthless, narcissistic and always eager for more power, he has been shown enjoying tormenting his former wife, as well as trying to blackmail Sue Ellen and suing Bobby. It is revealed during the season 2 finale that Ryland's transport company is also a front for cocaine smuggling where the contraband is pressure molded in the guise of designer knockoff merchandise, in this case, women's shoes. In season 3, Ryland is revealed as an operative with the CIA. Note: Pileggi previously played a very minor character named Evan Scott Morrisey who was in conflict with J.R. (4-episode appearance from 1989 to 1990, see film bio of actor for source)
 Kuno Becker as Andreas "Drew" Ramos (season 3; recurring, season 2; main), Elena's troubled brother. He witnessed his father's death, which turned him into an angry juvenile delinquent. He ended up enlisting in the military and after a tour in Iraq straightened him up, he found work on oil rigs all over the globe. He is on the run now after blowing up the Ewing rig. In the episode "Denial, Anger, Acceptance", it is revealed that he started the Southfork fire with an IED disguised as an air freshener (which served as a heat sensor) and using rocket fuel as a catalyst. He acted out of anger after learning of J.R.'s deception from Elena; however, it must be known that Drew thought no one was home when he set the fire, just as he thought the rig would be unoccupied at the time the bomb went off. At first, Sue Ellen thought she started the fire after drunkenly setting fire to John Ross's wedding invitation and initially took the blame for it. Once Drew learned that Nicolas was using his sister as a means to an end and not because Nicolas truly wanted justice for the Ramos family, Drew threatened to expose him and then is executed by Luis, one of the cartel enforcers. Nicolas gave the order right after the official news that Sue Ellen started the fire, who made Drew's execution looked like an apparent suicide. 
 Juan Pablo Di Pace as Nicolas Treviño (season 3), born Joaquin Reyes, a childhood friend of Elena and Drew Ramos who becomes a powerful self-made billionaire businessman from Mexico. He comes across as a good, genuine guy, even though there are darker parts of his personality which he's hiding. The episode "Denial, Anger, Acceptance" reveals that he is an enforcer with the Mendez-Ochoa drug cartel, initiated into the cartel by its leader El Posolero, recruited into their inner circle, and later sent to Europe to finish his education where he developed his considerable math skills. His intention was to use Elena Ramos as his way into Ewing Global and use it as a front to launder cartel profits. He is later taken into custody by the U.S. Marshals during the season finale; he initially agrees to take down the Mendez-Ochoa cartel by testifying against their members. However, Elena found her brother Drew's St. Christopher medal in Nicolas' bag when she found her cell phone, and knowing that the only way he could have that was if he was present at his brother's murder, she shoots Nicolas with a Browning Hi Power gun.

Recurring cast
 Ken Kercheval as Cliff Barnes (seasons 1–3), the long-time rival of J.R., as well as the half-brother of Christopher's adoptive mother and Bobby's first wife, Pamela Barnes Ewing. At the end of the original series, Cliff managed to gain control of Ewing Oil and now – more affluent than ever – his ongoing feud with the Ewings in general and J.R. in particular, continues. As shown in the season 1 finale, Cliff is behind Rebecca's scheming, as Rebecca's identity as Cliff's daughter is revealed. He was a main character in the original series, appearing throughout its run. He is arrested by the Mexican Federal Police in the season 2 finale as part of J.R.'s Masterpiece (where Bum steals Cliff's pistol and uses it to kill J.R. (who is dying of cancer) which results in Barnes' imprisonment). Throughout season 3, he is cohorting with Elena and Nicolas to bring down the Ewings. However, it all backfires on him when Elena gives both the land deed she receives from Bobby (presumably the land that J.R. swindled from her father) and Cliff's pardon to Pamela because she wants to wash her hands of the whole thing. Pamela visits Cliff in jail and gives him the land deed he wanted; however, she keeps the pardon and says goodbye to him, as justice for his role in the death of her unborn twins. 
 Judith Light as Judith Brown-Ryland (seasons 2–3), Harris Ryland's mother, "an authoritative and controlling battleaxe who will fight to the death to protect the people she loves". She is majority stockholder in Ryland Transportation. In season 3, she also runs an upscale brothel. The season 3 finale has a twist – she ends up collaborating with John Ross (after he had Emma released from the Mendez-Ochoa cartel) to become the Texas Railroad Commissioner after Bobby Ewing had to step down (where he and Sue Ellen regained the shares of Ewing Global). 
 Leonor Varela as Veronica Martinez/Marta Del Sol (season 1), a mentally unstable con artist who pretends to be a Mexican heiress. She is involved with J.R. and John Ross's plans to take over Southfork, until they turn on her and she is murdered by Vicente's gang.
 Callard Harris as Tommy Sutter (season 1), Rebecca's supposed older brother, involved in her plot to extort money from Christopher. It is eventually revealed he and Rebecca are not actually brother and sister, but lovers. As Rebecca's feelings for Christopher grow stronger, her and Tommy's relationship begins to crack, until Rebecca kills Tommy in self-defense during a fight.
 Marlene Forte as Carmen Ramos (seasons 1–3), the faithful Southfork cook and Elena and Drew's mother. She leaves Southfork after Drew's funeral service (presumably working for the Omni Hotel (Downtown Dallas) as a resident and housekeeper). 
 Charlene Tilton as Lucy Ewing (seasons 1–3), niece of J.R. and Bobby and the older cousin of John Ross and Christopher. She is the daughter of Gary and Valene Ewing and was a main character in the original series.
 Steve Kanaly as Ray Krebbs (seasons 1–3), Jock's illegitimate son and the half-brother of J.R., Bobby and Gary. A main character in the original series, he was the ranch foreman at Southfork until he left for Europe during season 12.
 Kevin Page as Steven "Bum" Jones (seasons 1–3), J.R. Ewing's private investigator, confidant, friend and right-hand man; he is later complicit in J.R.'s plot against Cliff Barnes to frame Cliff for his death (knowing his cancer would eventually take his life).  Bum later begins working for John Ross after J.R.'s death.
Lee Majors as Ken Richards (season 2), an old admirer of Sue Ellen's and a commissioner of T.E.S.H.A., a state agency looking into Christopher's rig explosion.
Steven Weber as Governor Sam McConaughey (seasons 2–3), who joins forces with Cliff Barnes and Harris Ryland to try and take down the Ewings. It was revealed that when Barnes and Ryland joined forces, McConaughey's campaign for governor was aided greatly by Ryland.
 Faran Tahir as Frank Ashkani (seasons 1–2), Cliff's menacing right-hand man. Born Rahid Durani in Islamabad, he was taken off the streets by Cliff some 30 years ago. Cliff gave him a proper education, eventually hired him as his private driver, and "adopted" him as a son. Marginalized and betrayed by Cliff, Ashkani began colluding with J.R.  Cliff learned of the defection, he set up Ashkani to take the rap for Tommy's murder and convinced him to make a statement at the clearing Rebecca, and to afterwards commit suicide by swallowing a poison pill Cliff gave him. Ashkani made the statement and committed suicide while being arraigned for Tommy Sutter's murder.
 Carlos Bernard as Vicente Cano (seasons 1–2), a Venezuelan businessman who finances J.R. and John Ross' deal with Veronica. When the Ewings fail to hold up their end of the deal, he turns violent. He eventually is sentenced to prison, after federal agents raid his house.  In season 2, he escapes from the supervision of the Venezuelan consul general while awaiting extradition.  He holds the Ewings hostage at Southfork to force Christopher to turn over his methane extraction technology, but this attempt fails and he is shot dead by Elena's brother Drew.
 Alex Fernandez as Roy Vickers (season 2), Harris Ryland's right-hand man who is connected to the Mendez-Ochoa drug cartel – also complicit in the bombing of the methane rig where Drew Ramos plants a bomb on it which results in Pamela's miscarriage. He is later killed in police custody (presumably after Cliff Barnes made a phone call after meeting with Harris Ryland where Barnes threatened to expose Ryland for sabotaging the rig). 
 AnnaLynne McCord as Heather (season 3), one of the workers in Southfork Ranch's cattle operations.
 Donny Boaz as Bo McCabe (seasons 2–3), a worker in Southfork Ranch's cattle operations first seen in the episode "A Call to Arms" as a drug pusher where Emma Ryland was scoring painkillers. In season 3, he is the ex-husband of Heather who has a child when they were briefly married. He is a former professional bull rider who was injured where he has a dark secret – prescription drug addiction to painkillers and dealing drugs which John Ross uncovers in the episode "Playing Chicken". The episode "Victims of Love" (where he was hospitalized with a spinal cord injury after the Southfork fire) he relents to an experimental spinal cord operation which he goes overseas to Tel Aviv where the spinal cord rehab is being experimented. 
 Jude Demorest as Candace Shaw (season 3), John Ross' secretary who is also a prostitute connected to Judith Ryland's prostitution ring. John Ross later has her terminated for unwanted sexual advances which results in her firing by Harris Ryland – she later faces Emma to the point where her family's illegal activities (her dad's business with the Ochoa-Mendez drug cartel, the CIA, and her grandmother's prostitution ring) were part of a plot to bring down Ewing Global. The episode "Victims of Love" reveal that she was  murdered by the Ochoa-Mendez drug cartel where they dismembered her hands later delivered to the Rylands which results in Ann and Emma kidnapped. 
 Fran Kranz as Hunter McKay (season 3), the grandson of original character Carter McKay. A partying geek entrepreneur who played basketball with John Ross Ewing and Christopher Ewing as a kid. Founder of Get It Games video software company. Purchased controlling interest in Ewing Global when it went public in 2014.  
 Antonio Jaramillo as Luis (season 3), a Mendez-Ochoa cartel enforcer. In the episode "Denial, Anger, Acceptance", he is the mastermind who executes Drew Ramos while Nicolas becomes complicit (both he and Nicolas made Drew's execution as if he committed suicide). He also masterminds the kidnapping of Ann and Emma where he held them hostage in Tamaulipas where El Posolero and Nicolas arranged a meeting where he went rogue – during the season finale where John Ross (who collaborates with a CIA contractor) is about to take back Ewing Global from the cartel, he and the entire entourage are taken into custody by the Mexican Marines – he is executed in prison with El Posolero where his right-hand triggerman (who aligns with Nicolas) orders the hit.

Episodes

The first season premiered on June 13, 2012, and introduces the central characters of the show: John Ross Ewing III, Christopher Ewing, Elena Ramos, Rebecca Sutter, Ann Ewing, Bobby Ewing, Sue Ellen Ewing and J.R. Ewing. The main focus of the season 1 is the discovery of oil reserves on Southfork by John Ross and attempts by him and his father, J.R. to wrest the land from Bobby. Other storylines in this season include the love triangle between John Ross, Christopher and Elena,  Christopher's marriage to Rebecca, Sue Ellen's plans to run for Governor of Texas and Bobby's health problems.

Production
Prior to Dallas, Cidre was best known for producing and writing episodes of Cane, an American television drama that chronicled the lives and internal power struggles of a powerful and affluent Cuban-American family running an immensely successful rum and sugar cane business in South Florida. In 2010, TNT announced it would order a pilot for the continuation of the Dallas series. The pilot was filmed in and around the city of Dallas in early 2011. Production began in late August 2011 in Dallas on the remaining nine episodes in the first season order, based in studios constructed for the Fox television series The Good Guys.

Executive producer Cynthia Cidre wrote the pilot script, while Michael M. Robin served as the director and executive producer for the pilot. David Jacobs reviewed Cidre's pilot script and gave his blessing to the new series though he has chosen not to participate in its production. A dispute erupted when the opening credits were originally planned to read "Developed by Cynthia Cidre, based on Dallas created by David Jacobs". But upon the determination of the Writers Guild of America's screenwriting credit system, there are currently two separate credits: one listing Jacobs as the show's sole creator and another listing Cidre as the new show's developer.

A sneak preview of the series, including clips from the pilot episode, aired on July 11, 2011, during an episode of TNT's Rizzoli & Isles. Patrick Duffy stated that the new show is "exactly the same [as the old show], but it's 2012. We consider this year 14 of the show. It's exactly as if [viewers] forgot which channel we were on."

Continuity
The new series is a continuation of the old series following a 20-year break, during which the characters and their relationships continued unseen until today when the new series begins. It does not take the events of the reunion TV movies Dallas: J.R. Returns or Dallas: War of the Ewings into account. Instead, we find the characters having evolved over the last 20 years. Cynthia Cidre, show developer, has confirmed that the new series does not pick up from where the TV movies left off because the movies had tried to resolve lingering plotlines in less than two hours. It continues from the events of the 14th season, their development and consequences extrapolated to 2012.

Production crew
Cynthia Cidre, Bruce Rasmussen, Michael M. Robin, Ken Topolsky and Bryan J. Raber served as executive producers for the show. Rasmussen had previously worked as the supervising producer with the hit TV series Roseanne, for which he was awarded the Golden Globe.

In the first two seasons, Jesse Bochco and Michael M. Robin were the most prolific directors, each directing five episodes.

Filming
Unlike the original series, which did limited location shooting in Texas but was filmed primarily in Los Angeles, principal photography for the new series takes place in and around Dallas. The new series also did location shooting at the actual Southfork Ranch in the northern Dallas suburb of Parker.

Opening sequence
The opening sequence features a shortened version of the original theme music, and echoes the original series opening with modernized shots of Dallas in sliding panels. Unlike the original series, the actors are not listed alphabetically and, for seasons 1 and 2,  there are no images of the actors seen in the credits. Josh Henderson and Jesse Metcalfe alternate top billing, and the original stars are credited at the end ("with Patrick Duffy", "and Linda Gray", "and Larry Hagman as J.R. Ewing") until Hagman's death in season 2.  The Dallas logo scrolls from right to left, rather than zooming upwards as it did on the original series. The sequence ends on a shot with the camera flying towards Southfork similar to the shot in the original titles where the camera flies over the gate towards Southfork.  The season 3 titles feature the return of the iconic threeway split-screen opening, similar to those used in the original series for its first 11 years, with moving images of the actors. In addition, the Dallas  season 3 logo zooms towards the screen as it did on the original series.

Reception
Advance screening reviews of the series were generally positive from critics on Metacritic. On June 29, 2012, TNT renewed Dallas for a second season consisting of 15 episodes, which premiered on January 28, 2013. The second season received positive notice, with a score of 82/100 from reviews on Metacritic.

Ratings

Home releases

Awards and nominations

References

External links

Official website for Southfork Ranch

 
2010s American LGBT-related drama television series
2012 American television series debuts
2014 American television series endings
American television soap operas
American primetime television soap operas
English-language television shows
American sequel television series
Serial drama television series
Television series about dysfunctional families
Television series by Warner Horizon Television
Television series by Warner Bros. Television Studios
Television shows set in Dallas
Television shows filmed in Texas
TNT (American TV network) original programming
Television series created by David Jacobs (writer)
Works about petroleum